IFA-2 (Interconnexion France-Angleterre 2) is a subsea electrical interconnector, running beneath the English Channel between France and the United Kingdom. IFA-2 is the second interconnector built between France and Great Britain, after IFA (HVDC Cross-Channel) link.

Route
The cable connects to the French grid at the Tourbe 400kV substation.

On the British side, the landfall point is located at Monks Hill Beach, at the southern end of Solent Airfield, near Portsmouth. The converter station is located to the north east of Solent Airfield.

Project history
The project was developed by IFA2 SAS, a joint venture between the UK's National Grid and RTE of France.

In 2015, the European Commission identified IFA-2 as one of key energy infrastructure projects.

In 2017, contract for IFA-2 was awarded to the Prysmian Group and ABB.

In October 2019, the project completed the external construction of the UK convertor building.
 Cable laying works in the eastern Solent took place at the end of 2019.

The cable was energised for the first time on 15 Oct 2020, in preparation for testing before going live. It was placed into live operation on 22 January 2021 with an opening flow from France to the UK. The connector tripped in the morning of January 29, causing a loss of 900MW, and grid batteries compensated some of the loss to keep frequency drop at 0.25Hz.

See also

 ElecLink, a 1,000 MW UK-France interconnector through the Channel Tunnel, completed in 2021

References

External links
 IFA2 Interconnector
 RTE website
 IFA-2 Corporate website
 Non-technical summary (pdf)
 Copy of information boards displayed in 2017 (pdf)

Electrical interconnectors to and from Great Britain
Electrical interconnectors to and from the Synchronous Grid of Continental Europe
Proposed electric power transmission systems
Proposed electric power infrastructure in England
Proposed electric power infrastructure in France
HVDC transmission lines
France–United Kingdom relations
Energy infrastructure completed in 2021
2021 establishments in France
2021 establishments in England